Alice Kimball Smith (1907–2001) was an American historian, writer, and teacher, particularly known from her writing from personal experience on the Manhattan Project.

Early life and education

Smith was born in Oak Park, Illinois in 1907. She first went to college at Mount Holyoke College where she obtained her A.B in 1928. Eight years later, she got her PhD from Yale University.

War years
In 1943 her and her husband Cyril moved to Los Alamos when her husband joined the Manhattan Project. She soon got a teaching job in Los Alamos where her and her husband became friends with J. Robert Oppenheimer and his wife Kitty. She would use her experiences around Los Alamos as material in her future books.
Smith, in her study of American A-bomb scientists interviewed many Los Alamos scientists who gave blank answers about the nature of the weapon that they were creating.

Post war years
Smith and her husband moved to Chicago after World War II ended. Smith became the Bulletin of the Atomic Scientists assistant editor where she worked for many years. She was a lecturer at Roosevelt College and a dean, assistant dean and scholar at Radcliffe Institute for Independent Study. Smith also briefly was a guest columnist in The New York Times in 1983.

Books
Smith wrote books like A Peril and a Hope: The Scientists’ Movement in America, 1945–1947 and co edited (with Charles Weiner) Robert Oppenheimer: Letters and Recollections with the latter being a collection of letters from J. Robert Oppenheimer between 1922 and 1945. Her book A Peril and a Hope: The Scientist' Movement in America, 1945–1947 was nominated for a National Book Award for Nonfiction in the Science, Philosophy and Religion category. A Peril and a Hope was about the growing negative sentiment of scientists about creating the atomic bomb due to their concerns over the sociopolitical consequences of its usage.

Personal life
Alice Kimball was married to British metallurgist Cyril Smith. She died on February 6, 2001, at her home in Ellensburg, Washington.

References

External links
 

1907 births
2001 deaths
People from Chicago
Historians from Illinois
People from Oak Park, Illinois
People from Ellensburg, Washington
Educators from Illinois
American women educators
Writers from Chicago
Mount Holyoke College alumni
Yale University alumni
20th-century American women
20th-century American people
Historians from Washington (state)